Heartbreak U.S.A. is an album recorded by Kitty Wells and released in 1961 on the Decca label (DL 4141). The title track, "Heartbreak U.S.A." reached No. 1 on the U.S. Billboard country and western chart.

Track listing
Side 1
 "Heartbreak U.S.A." (Harlan Howard) [2:35]
 "Heart to Heart Talk"	(Lee Ross)
 "Heartaches by the Number" (Harlan Howard) [2:50]
 "My Heart Echoes" (John Bailes, Homer Bailes, Zeke Clements, Muriel Wright) [2:29]
 "I've Got a New Heartache" (Ray Price, Wayne Walker) [2:31]
 "Open Up Your Heart (and Let the Sunshine In)" (Stuart Hamblen) [3:03]

Side 2
 "This Old Heart" (Eddie Miller, Bob Morris) [2:18]
 "I'll Hold You in My Heart (Till I Can Hold You in My Arms)" (Eddy Arnold, Thomas Dilbeck)
 "Excuse Me (I Think I've Got a Heartache)" (Buck Owens, Harlan Howard) [2:45]
 "Cold, Cold Heart" (Hank Williams) [3:06]
 "The Best of All My Heartaches" (Tom Tall) [2:25]
 "Leave All the Heartache to Me" (Bill Anderson) [2:40]

References

1960 albums
Albums produced by Owen Bradley
Decca Records albums
Kitty Wells albums